John O'Neal (1841—after 1872) was an Irish-born United States Navy sailor who received the Medal of Honor for heroism on April 12, 1872.

Medal of Honor citation

<blockquote> Serving on board the U.S.S. Kansas, O'Neal displayed great coolness and self-possession at the time Comdr. A. F. Crosman and others were drowned near Greytown, Nicaragua, 12 April 1872, and by personal exertion prevented greater loss of life.

See also

List of Medal of Honor recipients

References

Irish-born Medal of Honor recipients
1841 births
19th-century Irish people
Year of death missing
Irish emigrants to the United States (before 1923)
United States Navy sailors
United States Navy Medal of Honor recipients
Irish sailors in the United States Navy
Non-combat recipients of the Medal of Honor